The 1996 German Grand Prix was a Formula One motor race held at Hockenheim on 28 July 1996. It was the eleventh race of the 1996 Formula One World Championship.

The 45-lap race was won by British driver Damon Hill, driving a Williams-Renault, after he started from pole position. Austrian driver Gerhard Berger started alongside Hill on the front row in his Benetton-Renault and led for much of the race, until his engine failed with three laps remaining. Hill duly took his seventh victory of the season, with Berger's French teammate Jean Alesi second and Canadian Jacques Villeneuve third in the other Williams-Renault.

With the win, Hill extended his lead over Villeneuve in the Drivers' Championship to 21 points with five races remaining.

Classification

Qualifying

Race

Notes 
 Giovanni Lavaggi replaced Giancarlo Fisichella at Minardi for the remainder of the season.
 Though the Forti team arrived, neither of its cars were assembled as the team had run out of money and therefore could not obtain any engines. It closed down shortly afterwards.

Championship standings after the race

Drivers' Championship standings

Constructors' Championship standings

References

German Grand Prix
German Grand Prix
Grand Prix
German Grand Prix